Halim Perdanakusuma International Airport  is an international airport in Jakarta, Indonesia. The airport is located in East Jakarta and the airfield is conjoined with the Halim Perdanakusuma air force base of the Indonesian Air Force.

Aside from commercial scheduled flights, this airport is also used for military, private and presidential purposes. The airport is used for corporate aviation with frequent arrivals and departures of corporate aircraft both domestically and internationally. About 5.6 million passengers used the airport in 2016.

History
This airport takes its name from Air Vice-Marshal Halim Perdanakusuma, an Indonesian aviator. It is now home to a large number of turboprop, charter, and general aviation companies. It is a major air force base of the Indonesian Air Force and is home to most of its major squadrons, such as the 31st Squadron and the 17th VIP Squadron.

In the 1960s, it was also known as the Halim Perdana Kusumah Air Force Base, and before that it was known as Tjililitan Airport or Tjililitan Airfield, after its borough.

As a civilian airport, Halim Perdanakusuma was one of the city's main airports, along with Kemayoran Airport, until the opening of Soekarno–Hatta International Airport in Tangerang in 1985. Until then, it served all international routes bound for Jakarta, while Kemayoran handled domestic flights. The closure of Kemayoran in 1985 meant that Halim would serve as the secondary airport of Jakarta, mostly handling charter flights, general aviation, and flying school base for the next 29 years. In the 1990s the Directorate General of Civil Aviation mandated that Halim would serve non-scheduled flights, as well as scheduled flights with aircraft under 100 passengers capacity.

In 2013, To ease congestion at Soekarno–Hatta Airport, the Halim airport authority has announced that it will give 60 flight slots per hour for scheduled flights and, for the first time, the 2013 Haj pilgrims used this airport. Since 2014, the airport has served domestic scheduled flights with a capacity up to 2.2 million passengers per year from about 200,000 passengers in 2013.

In early November 2021, Indonesia's Ministry of Transportation announced they would close the airport temporarily for public use for the next nine months for renovation. Domestic flights would be moved to Soekarno–Hatta International Airport and Pondok Cabe Airport. This decision was made based on the evaluation of Halim's aging infrastructure, like the runways and terminals, and the impact to the airport's quality of services.

An express train has been planned to connect the two airports. Batik Air was the largest user, taking 32 slots from 74 slots available for all airlines a day.

Terminals

Passengers Terminal
This terminal serves for all departing and arriving flights. The terminal has an area of about ten thousand square metres only.

Presidential Terminal
This terminal is used solely by the President of the Republic of Indonesia and other VVIPs, including for state visits.

Airlines and destinations

Passenger

Cargo

SHIA to HPIA express rail link

The feasibility study of an airport-to-airport Express Train has been finished and ready for prequalification offering. The Express Train initial plan is from Soekarno–Hatta International Airport (SHIA) to Manggarai, but to realize needs of transportation from Halim Perdanakusuma Airport (HPA), the route is extended from Manggarai to HPA. The route will stretch 33 kilometers, from Halim-Cawang-Manggarai-Tanah Abang-Sudirman-Pluit-Terminal 2&3 SHIA, on surface, underground and elevated, and has been agreed by Peraturan Menteri Nomor 1264 Tahun 2013 of Transportation Ministry. The Express Train takes 30 minutes to travel between two airports instead of a 1 to 3 hours drive. In September 2019, then Minister of State Owned Eterprises Rini Soemarno confirmed that the ongoing Jakarta-Bandung High-Speed Rail project will also include a light rail station that is integrated with the HSR station, therefore providing connection between two airports via Greater Jakarta LRT and Soekarno–Hatta Airport Rail Link.

Halim Perdanakusuma Air Force base

Besides being an airport for commercial flights, the airport's airfield is also conjoined with the Halim Perdanakusuma Air Base of the Indonesian Air Force part of the 1st Air Force Operations Command (Komando Operasi Angkatan Udara I) responsible for the western section of the Indonesian airspace.

The airbase is home to five squadrons of the Indonesian Air Force and the headquarters to the 1st Air Force Operations Command. Other than that, the base is also occupied by more than twenty other units of the Indonesian Air Force such as the Air Force Education Command Headquarters (Makodikau), the National Air Defense Command Headquarters (Makohanudnas), the Headquarters of the National Air Defense Command Sector I (Makosekek I), the Air Survey and Photography Service (Dissurpotrudau), the Air Force Psychological Service (Dispsiau), and the dr. Esnawan Antariksa Air Force Hospital (RSAU dr. Esnawan Antariksa).

Accidents and Incidents
 On 24 June 1982, British Airways Flight 9, a Boeing 747-200 flew through a cloud of volcanic ash thrown up by the eruption of Mount Galunggung, causing the failure of all four engines. The crew diverted the aircraft to Jakarta and it landed safely.
On 9 May 2012, a Sukhoi Superjet 100 crashed into Mount Salak on  a test flight, killing all 45 people on board. The investigation found that pilot error was to blame. 
 On 21 June 2012, an Indonesian Air Force Fokker F-27 crashed on landing and hit a housing complex near Halim airport.
 On 4 April 2016, Batik Air Flight 7703, a Boeing 737-800 registration PK-LBS, collided with a TransNusa ATR 42 while taxiing. The Boeing 737 wingtip sliced the tail of the ATR. The wingtip of the Boeing 737 burst into flames but was quickly extinguished. No one on board was killed. 
On 20 March 2021, A Trigana Air Boeing 737-400 registered PK-YSF returned after it had problems with its landing gear. When the plane landed, the landing gear collapsed, causing the aircraft to skid off the runway. No injuries were reported.

Gallery

References

External links

 PT. Angkasa Pura II: Halim Perdanakusuma Airport 
 
 
 

Airports in Jakarta
Indonesian Air Force
Indonesian Air Force bases